The women's long jump competition at the 2012 Summer Olympics in London, United Kingdom, was held at the Olympic Stadium on 7–8 August.

Only three barely made the auto qualifying mark. Brittney Reese struggled with fouls and finally made a mark on her final attempt. Karin Melis Mey originally qualified for the final, but was pulled after a positive drug test.

In the final Ineta Radēviča took the first round lead with a 6.88, while Yelena Sokolova settled into second place. Brittney Reese, who has won every major championship since 2009, fouled her first attempt. In the second round, Reese hit to board cleanly, jumping 7.12. Three jumps later, Sokolova came close with a 7.07. Reese continued to struggle with three more foul jumps, her only other legal jump would have placed her eighth. Her one jump continued her string of championships. Sokolova had another attempt sufficient to get the silver, but could not challenge Reese for gold. Janay DeLoach spent the competition in fifth place until her fifth jump, when she bettered Radevica by a centimeter. Radevica had two more attempts, but couldn't improve, giving DeLoach the bronze.

Competition format
The competition consisted of two rounds, qualification and final. In qualification, each athlete jumped three times (stopping early if they made the qualifying distance). At least the top twelve athletes moved on to the final; if more than twelve reached the qualifying distance, all who did so advanced. Distances were reset for the final round. Finalists jumped three times, after which the eight best jumped three more times (with the best distance of the six jumps counted).

Schedule
All times are British Summer Time (UTC+1)

Records
, the existing World and Olympic records were as follows.

Results

Qualifying round
Qual. rule: qualification standard 6.70m (Q) or at least best 12 qualified (q).

Final

References

Athletics at the 2012 Summer Olympics
Long jump at the Olympics
2012 in women's athletics
Women's events at the 2012 Summer Olympics